Antonio "Tony" Fassina (born 26 July 1945) is a former rally driver from Italy. He won the Italian Rally Championship in 1976 and 1979 driving a Lancia Stratos HF, and then again in 1981 behind the wheel of an Opel Ascona. In 1982, he drove the Ascona to victory in the European Rally Championship. He also competed with success in the Italian round of the World Rally Championship, Rallye Sanremo, scoring four top five results between 1976 and 1981, including outright victory in the 1979 event ahead of Walter Röhrl.

He now runs Gruppo Fassina S.p.A. (Fassina Group), the business group he established in 1982 as a Milanese car dealership as he approached retirement from racing.

WRC victories
{|class="wikitable"
!   #  
! Event
! Season
! Co-driver
! Car
|-
| 1
|  21º Rallye Sanremo
| 1979
| Mauro Mannini
| Lancia Stratos HF
|}

External links
Profile of Fassina, Rallybase.nl

1945 births
Italian rally drivers
European Rally Championship drivers
Living people
World Rally Championship drivers